"Alekhine's gun" refers to a formation in chess. It may also refer to:
 Alekhine's Gun (video game), a 2016 video game
 Alekhine's Gun (band), a heavy metal band from New York